"Streets of Heaven" is a song co-written and recorded by Australian country music artist Sherrié Austin.  It was released in June 2003 as the first single and title track from her album Streets of Heaven. Austin wrote the song with Paul Duncan and Al Kasha.

Content
The song relates the latest in a mother's series of 2 AM hospital room prayers for her seriously ill and dying seven-year-old daughter. The title refers to the last line in each chorus, as well as the end of the song, wherein she makes the request, "So if you take her with you today, will you make sure she looks both ways, And would you hold her hand when she crosses the streets of Heaven."

Critical reception
The song received a favorable review from Ray Waddell of Billboard, who wrote that it is "the kind of tear-jerker that a country audience would absolutely embrace if given half a chance."

Chart performance
The song debuted at number 54 on the U.S. Billboard Hot Country Songs chart for the week of June 14, 2003. In November 2003, it became Austin's first top 20 single.

References

2003 singles
2003 songs
Sherrié Austin songs
BBR Music Group singles
Song recordings produced by Dann Huff
Songs written by Al Kasha
Songs about children